Hoseyni (also Romanized as Ḩoseynī and Hoseini; also known as ’aşīrī, Husaini, and ’oseynī) is a village in Pishkuh Rural District, in the Central District of Taft County, Yazd Province, Iran. At the 2006 census, its population was 880, in 145 families.

References 

Populated places in Taft County